Jeanne (or Johanna) of Hainault (1323 – December 1350) was ruling Countess of Soissons from 1344 until 1350.

She was a daughter of John of Beaumont, lord of Beaumont and Margaret of Soissons. She succeeded her mother in 1344 as Countess of Soissons.

Jeanne first married Louis II, Count of Blois. Together they had three sons:
 Louis III, Count of Blois and Soissons
 John II, Count of Blois
 Guy II, Count of Blois and Soissons.
Louis II died in 1346 at the battle of Crécy and Jeanne remarried to William I, Marquis of Namur. They had no children.

She died in 1350 from the Black Death.

References

Counts of Soissons
1350 deaths
1323 births
Soissons, Countess of, Jeanne of Hainault
14th-century deaths from plague (disease)
14th-century women rulers